R. T. McNamar (born April 21, 1939) is an American businessman who served as the United States Deputy Secretary of the Treasury from 1981 to 1985. He had previously served on the Advisory Board of unicorn company Afiniti. He married Scottsdale Arizona restaurateur Brenda Shrader at the base camp of K2 in Northern Pakistan in 2015.

References

1939 births
Living people
United States Deputy Secretaries of the Treasury
California Republicans
Reagan administration personnel